The San Mateo Mountains may refer to:

 San Mateo Mountains (Socorro County, New Mexico)
 San Mateo Mountains (Cibola County, New Mexico) in Cibola and McKinley counties in New Mexico, which includes Mount Taylor
 San Mateo Mesa (McKinley County, New Mexico)
 the Cerrillos Hills, see Cerrillos Hills State Park, which were formerly known as the Sierra de San Mateo